Bardens is a surname. Notable people with the surname include: 

David Bardens (born 1984), German physician
Dennis Bardens (1911—2004), British journalist 
Peter Bardens (1945–2002), English keyboardist